Francesca McDonagh (born ) is an Irish-British banker. Since September 2022, she is the Group Chief Operating Officer (COO) of Credit Suisse. Prior to that, she served as Group Chief  Officer (CEO) of Bank of Ireland from October 2017 - August 2022, when she succeeded Richie Boucher who had served as CEO of the bank from February 2009.

Education 
McDonagh grew up in Croydon in London and attended Coloma Comprehensive Girls’ School in Croydon. She studied at Oxford University where she graduated with a Bachelor of Arts degree in Politics, Philosophy and Economics.

Bank of Ireland CEO
McDonagh joined Bank of Ireland from HSBC Group, where she held a number of senior management roles. She is the first female CEO of Bank of Ireland.

Bank of Ireland was the country’s only domestic lender to avoid nationalisation during the financial crisis. By 2013, the bank had returned €6 billion for the €4.8 billion State aid injection.

Early challenges in her role include the fallout of the tracker mortgage issue. McDonagh and the heads of the other five main Irish retail banks were called by Finance Minister Paschal Donohoe to discuss their respective plans on resolving the tracker mortgage issue that had impacted their customers.

McDonagh has stated her focus is on technological transformation, improvements in internal culture, and enhanced customer service across the Group. She has also promoted Bank of Ireland’s objective to reach 50:50 gender balance in management and leadership appointments by 2021.

On 26 April 2022, Bank of Ireland announced that McDonagh would step down as Group CEO in September.

Personal life
McDonagh, an Irish national, was born in Wimbledon, London, to an Irish father and Egyptian mother. McDonagh's paternal grandfather comes from the village of Carraroe in County Galway and her paternal grandmother is from Laois.

She lives in Dalkey, Dublin, with her husband, who is French and owns a patisserie business.

References 

Irish bankers
Living people
Year of birth missing (living people)